

Leofsige (died 19 August 1033) was a medieval Bishop of Worcester. He was consecrated in 1016. He died on 19 August 1033.

Citations

References

External links
 

Bishops of Worcester
1033 deaths
11th-century English Roman Catholic bishops
Year of birth unknown